Dean Puckett (15 January 1982) is an English filmmaker.

Biography
Dean Puckett is a documentary filmmaker from England. He produced and edited the comedy horror spectacular Loony In The Woods (directed by Leo Leigh), which is set for worldwide distribution by Troma Entertainment. His first feature-length documentary, The Elephant in the Room (2008), won best UK documentary at London Independent Film Festival and Best Director at the Portobello Film Festival.

Puckett's second documentary film, The Crisis Of Civilization, based on the book of the same name by Nafeez Mosaddeq Ahmed, was exhibited at film festivals.

His new documentary, Grasp The Nettle, was released in 2013. The film was described by The London Film Review as "an intriguing, intimate, and at times quite powerful documentary".

He has directed several music videos and edited the documentary Blackpool Las Vegas of The North, also directed by Leo Leigh and Andy Capper for Vice magazine - VBS TV.

Filmography

films
Loony in the Woods (Producer) (2006)
The Crisis of Civilization (2011)
Grasp the Nettle (2013)

Awards 
Portobello Film Festival (Best Director)
London Independent Film Festival (Best UK Documentary)

References

External links
deaddeanfilms.co.uk

English film directors
Living people
Year of birth missing (living people)